Cosmic Requiem is an EP by the British doom metal band Cathedral.  It was released in 1994 on Earache Records. Tracks 1, 2 and 4 were originally released on the Statik Majik EP.

Track listing 
 "Cosmic Funeral" – 7:01
 "Hypnos 164" – 5:44
 "A Funeral Request – Rebirth" – 7:33
 "The Voyage of the Homeless Sapien" – 22:42

Credits 
 Lee Dorrian – vocals, production
 Garry Jennings – guitars, bass guitar, keyboards, production
 Adam Lehan – guitars
 Mark Ramsey Wharton – drums, flute
 Paul Johnson – production
 David Bianco – production on track 4

Cathedral (band) EPs
1994 EPs
Earache Records EPs